Robert Arthur Mould (born October 16, 1960) is an American musician, principally known for his work as guitarist, vocalist, and songwriter for alternative rock bands Hüsker Dü in the 1980s and Sugar in the 1990s.

Early years
Born in Malone, New York, Mould lived in several places, including the Minneapolis-St. Paul area, where he attended Macalester College. There, he formed Hüsker Dü in the late 1970s with drummer/singer Grant Hart and bass guitarist Greg Norton. Mould and Hart were the principal songwriters for Hüsker Dü, with Hart's higher-pitched vocals and Mould's baritone taking the lead in alternate songs.

Musical career

Hüsker Dü

Forming in 1979, Hüsker Dü first gained notice as a punk rock group with a series of recordings on the independent label SST Records. In 1986, they signed with a major record label (Warner Bros. Records), but found only modest commercial success. However, they were later often cited as one of the key influences on 1990s alternative rock, including bands such as Nirvana and Pixies.

In the late 1980s, Hüsker Dü broke up acrimoniously amid members' drug abuse, personal problems, disputes over songwriting credits, musical direction, and the suicide of the band's manager, David Savoy. Mould and Grant Hart, the band's other songwriter and vocalist, still took occasional jabs at each other in the press until Hart's death in 2017, though the two briefly revisited their Hüsker Dü back catalog together at a 2004 benefit concert for an ailing friend, the late Karl Mueller of Soul Asylum.

First solo period (1988–1991)

After Hüsker Dü broke up in 1988, Mould sequestered himself in a remote farmhouse in Pine City, Minnesota, having quit drinking and drugs, and wrote the songs that would make up his first solo album. Signing to the newly formed Virgin Records America label, 1989's Workbook eschewed Mould's trademark wall-of-noise guitar for a lighter tone. Drummer Anton Fier (of The Feelies and later The Golden Palominos) and bassist Tony Maimone (of Pere Ubu) served as Mould's rhythm section. The album peaked at number 127 on the Billboard 200 chart, and the single "See a Little Light" reached number 4 on the Billboard Modern Rock Tracks chart.

1990's Black Sheets of Rain had a much heavier guitar sound, recalling Hüsker Dü's louder, angrier moments. According to the liner notes for the 2012 re-release of Sugar's Copper Blue, Creation Records president Alan McGee verified that total album sales were 7,000 copies. Still, the album peaked at number 123 on the Billboard 200 chart, and the single "It's Too Late" reached number 10 on the Billboard Modern Rock Tracks chart.

Mould also co-founded a record label, Singles Only Label, with Coyote Records label founder Steve Fallon. The label released singles from bands such as Daniel Johnston, Grant Lee Buffalo, Moby, Mojo Nixon, Morphine, Nikki Sudden, and R. Stevie Moore from 1989 to 1994.

Sugar (1992–1995)

Mould then formed the group Sugar, with bassist David Barbe and drummer Malcolm Travis. Along with extensive touring, Sugar released two albums, an EP and a B-sides collection before breaking up. 1992's Copper Blue was named as NME's 1992 Album of the Year, and was Mould's most successful commercial album, selling nearly 300,000 copies.

While in the band Sugar, in 1993 he contributed the track "Can't Fight It" as a solo artist to the AIDS Benefit Album No Alternative produced by the Red Hot Organization. In 1994, he recorded "Turning of the Tide" for Beat The Retreat, a tribute album to the English guitarist and songwriter Richard Thompson.

Second solo period (1996–present)
In 1996, Mould returned to solo recording, releasing a self-titled album in 1996 on Rykodisc, often referred to as Hubcap because of the cover photo. Mould played all of the instruments himself, and programmed the drums instead of using a real drummer. The album peaked at number 101 on the Billboard 200 chart, and number 1 on the Heatseekers chart.

In 1998, Mould released The Last Dog and Pony Show, his final album on Rykodisc (who had released all of the Sugar albums in the U.S.). The album was named as such because Mould decided that the tour that followed would be his "last electric band tour."

After the tour, Mould took a break from the music world to get involved with another passion of his, professional wrestling, when he joined WCW as a scriptwriter in 1999 for a brief period. Creative differences with some of the other writers led to Mould's leaving the company and returning to music. The liner notes for the 2002 album Modulate thank some of the wrestlers he associated with, most notably Kevin Nash and Kevin Sullivan.

During a stint living in New York City in the late-1990s, as he more fully embraced his identity as a gay man, Mould's tastes took a detour into dance music and electronica. Those influences were clear on his 2002 release Modulate, which featured a strong electronica influence to mixed critical reviews and poor fan reaction. One song, "The Receipt," was fairly straightforward, according to City Pages: it "can be taken as a barely veiled attack on Mould's old Husker Dü-mate Grant Hart." (In fact, another song on the album ["Trade"] had been written and performed live during his Hüsker Dü days.) In further pursuit of this sound, Mould also began recording under the pseudonym LoudBomb (an anagram of his name), releasing one CD ("Long Playing Grooves") so far under this name.

His next solo album, Body of Song, had been originally scheduled to closely follow the release of 2002's Modulate. Instead, Mould worked on the album for the next three years, resulting in a 2005 release. By this time, he had changed his mind on touring with a band, and announced his first band tour since 1998. The tour lineup included bassist Jason Narducy (of Verbow), drummer Brendan Canty (of Fugazi), and Mould's Blowoff collaborator, Morel, on keyboards.

In addition to his solo work, Mould also worked as a live DJ in collaboration with Washington DC-area dance music artist Richard Morel, under the collective banner Blowoff. They frequently staged at the 9:30 Club in Washington, D.C. A Blowoff CD was released in September 2006, consisting of songs recorded together by the two. Mould has also done remixes for a variety of dance and alternative rock artists, including a remix of the Interpol song "Length of Love."

District Line was released February 5, 2008. A little over a year later, on April 7, 2009, Mould released his next album entitled Life and Times in the midst of researching his life for an autobiography.

Mould ultimately wrote that memoir with Michael Azerrad, the author of Our Band Could Be Your Life and Come as You Are: The Story of Nirvana. The book, See a Little Light: The Trail of Rage and Melody, was published in June 2011.

On August 6, 2012, Mould released the first single from his first album on Merge Records, Silver Age, on September 4, 2012. It peaked at #52 on the Billboard 200 album chart, #12 on the Alternative Albums chart, and #3 on the Tastemaker Albums chart. In 2014 Mould released Beauty & Ruin and in March 2016, his album Patch the Sky was released.

On October 25, 2018 Mould shared a new song, "Sunshine Rock" from his new album of the same name, arriving February 8, 2019 via Merge Records 

On June 3, 2020 Mould released a new song "American Crisis" the lead single from his album Blue Hearts, released on September 25.

Instruments 
As a member of Hüsker Dü, Mould was known for playing Flying V–style guitars, mainly an Ibanez Rocket Roll Jr.

In 1988, Mould bought a blue Fender American Standard Stratocaster off the rack after playing it "for about 15 seconds, unplugged." The Stratocaster has been his electric guitar of choice since the breakup of Hüsker Dü around that time. His favored acoustic guitar is a 12-string Yamaha APX.

Collaborations
Mould has made various guest appearances throughout his career. In 1984, Mould played piano on Ground Zero's album Ground Zero. In 1991, Mould sang and played guitar on the Golden Palominos album Drunk with Passion on the song "Dying from the Inside Out." In 1992, he contributed vocals to the song, "Dio" on the Throwing Muses album Red Heaven. Mould performed the guitars for the soundtrack for the film version of Hedwig and the Angry Inch, released in 1999. In 2000, Mould sang "He Didn't" (written by Stephin Merritt) on The 6ths' album Hyacinths and Thistles. He also contributed vocals to the 2009 Fucked Up cover of "Do They Know It's Christmas?"

Mould performed on the Foo Fighters 2011 album Wasting Light, contributing guitar and vocals to the track "Dear Rosemary." He made sporadic appearances with the band during their Wasting Light tour to perform the song on stage, including on the Conan O'Brien show. In December 2017, Mould opened for the Foo Fighters in four states during their Concrete and Gold tour.

Personal life
Though Mould's sexual orientation had previously been something of an open secret, he was outed in the early 1990s in an interview in the music magazine Spin; he came to terms with being openly gay, even appearing in the movie Bear Nation, self-identifying as a bear.

In April 2004, Mould was a co-organizer of the WEDRock benefit concert for Freedom to Marry. "WedRock" was a play on the word "wedlock". The event raised an estimated US$30,000. Mould also contributed the song "See a Little Light" to the 2006 album
Wed-Rock: A Benefit for Freedom to Marry, an album to support in the legalization
of same-sex marriage.

In interviews to promote his 2019 album Sunshine Rock, Mould revealed that he had been residing in Berlin, Germany, since 2015.

In popular culture
Mould's song "Dog on Fire" is the theme song for The Daily Show.  He originally wrote the track for his third solo album, but cut it as redundant.  The name was picked by mastering engineer Jim Wilson from an offhand comment Mould made in an interview. They Might Be Giants performed updated versions which were used in the 2000s, and the song was later remixed by Timbaland when Trevor Noah took over as host. On December 19, 1996, Mould made a cameo appearance on The Daily Show Holiday Spectacular in an homage duet of "The Little Drummer Boy" with Mould playing the part of David Bowie to Craig Kilborn's "Bing Crosby".

Mould is a passionate wrestling fan and was previously a writer for WCW.

The song "See a Little Light" has been used more than once in various television applications: It was used in the closing scene of the original un-aired test pilot episode of Buffy the Vampire Slayer, it was also used in the closing scene of the season 1 finale for 13 Reasons Why, it became one of the principal theme songs for the HBO series The Mind of the Married Man and was also used in a television commercial for TIAA-CREF (August 2007). Mould also composed the theme for the TLC program, In a Fix.

In 2001, Mould played lead guitar in the house band for the film of John Cameron Mitchell's Hedwig and the Angry Inch,  and on the film's soundtrack. In 2003, Mould also participated in a Hedwig tribute album, Wig in a Box, on which he covered the song "Nailed."

On September 29, 2005, Mould's song "Circles" was included on The OC.

Mould appeared on an episode of Independent Film Channel's The Henry Rollins Show on June 15, 2007.

On November 21, 2011, musicians such as Dave Grohl, Britt Daniel and Jessica Dobson of Spoon, Craig Finn and Tad Kubler of The Hold Steady, Randy Randall and Dean Allen Spunt of No Age, Margaret Cho, Jason Narducy, Jon Wurster of Superchunk, and Ryan Adams came together at the Walt Disney Concert Hall and played songs from Bob Mould's career. During the concert, Bob discussed his then-forthcoming album Silver Age, involving Jason Narducy and drummer Jon Wurster (of Superchunk), and a limited tour of Sugar's debut album Copper Blue.

Mould has been honored with two stars on the outside mural of the Minneapolis nightclub First Avenue, one for his solo work and one for Hüsker Dü. The stars recognize performers that have played sold-out shows or have otherwise demonstrated a major contribution to the culture at the iconic venue. Receiving a star "might be the most prestigious public honor an artist can receive in Minneapolis," according to journalist Steve Marsh.

Discography

Studio albums

Notes

AWorkbook 25 — A remastered version of Workbook including a second disc of live versions of the songs recorded after the original release in 1989 was released in 2014.

Compilations and live albums
Poison Years (1994, Virgin)
Live Dog '98 (2002, Granary Music) (released under the name 'Bob Mould Band')
Live At ATP 2008 (2009, Granary Music) (released under the name 'Bob Mould Band')
Bob Mould + The Last Dog And Pony Show + LiveDog98 (2012, Edsel)
Distortion: 1989-2019 (Series of boxsets released  2020-2021, Demon Records / Edsel)

Singles
"See a Little Light" (1989) #4 US Modern Rock Songs
"It's Too Late" (1990) #10 Modern Rock Songs
"Egøverride" (1996)
"Fort Knox, King Solomon" (1996)
"Classifieds"/"Moving Trucks" (1998)
"Soundonsound" (2002)
"Paralyzed" (2005)
"The Silence Between Us" (2008)
"I'm Sorry, Baby, But You Can't Stand in My Light Anymore" (2009)
"The Descent" (2012)
"I Don't Know You Anymore" (2014)
"Hold On" (2016)
"Voices in My Head" (2016)
"Sunshine Rock" (2018)
"Lost Faith" (2019)
"American Crisis" (2020)
"Siberian Butterfly" (2020)

Videos
Circle of Friends (2007, MVD Visual)
See a Little Light: A Celebration of the Music and Legacy of Bob Mould (2013)

Contributions
Various artist compilations including individual tracks by Bob Mould:
No Alternative (1994) – includes "Can't Fight It"
Beat the Retreat: Songs by Richard Thompson (1994) – includes "Turning of the Tide" by Richard Thompson, performed by Bob Mould
Wig in a Box (2003) – includes "Nailed"
Wed-Rock: A Benefit for Freedom To Marry (2006) – includes "If I Can't Change Your Mind (acoustic)"
30 Days, 50 Songs (2016) - includes "In a Free Land (live)"

Bands produced
Man Sized Action, Claustrophobia
Soul Asylum, Made to Be Broken
Articles of Faith, Give Thanks and In This Life
Magnapop, Hot Boxing
Verbow, Chronicles
The Zulus, Down on the Floor
Friction Wheel, Something Tells Me/Won't Fall Down – SOL
Impaler, If We Had Brains... We'd Be Dangerous
Low, Tonight the Monkeys Die Remixes EP
Half a Chicken, Food For Thought
Starfish, Stellar Sonic Solutions
Titus Andronicus, An Obelisk

References

External links

Interview with The Quietus 21/02/14
Interview with The Onion A.V. Club
Figure 8 Interview with Bob Mould 19/05/13
Official Bob Mould Granary Music artist page
Wishing Well: A Small Web Site About the Music of Bob Mould
Paul Hilcoff's Hüsker Dü Database
Bob Mould Soundcheck (3:16) published on the Tellus Audio Cassette Magazine @ Ubuweb

American baritones
American bloggers
American DJs
American alternative rock musicians
American indie rock musicians
21st-century American memoirists
Gay singers
Gay songwriters
Gay memoirists
American punk rock guitarists
Alternative rock guitarists
Alternative rock singers
American punk rock singers
Record producers from New York (state)
American rock songwriters
Hardcore punk musicians
Songwriters from New York (state)
Club DJs
Creation Records artists
Hüsker Dü members
LGBT DJs
LGBT people from New York (state)
American LGBT singers
American LGBT songwriters
People
Living people
Singers from Minnesota
Singers from New York (state)
Singers from Washington, D.C.
New Alliance Records artists
SST Records artists
People from Malone, New York
Remixers
Rykodisc artists
Sugar (American band) members
The Golden Palominos members
Virgin Records artists
Warner Records artists
Macalester College alumni
American gay musicians
American gay writers
People from Pine City, Minnesota
Songwriters from Minnesota
Guitarists from Washington, D.C.
Guitarists from New York (state)
Guitarists from Minnesota
American male guitarists
20th-century American guitarists
American male non-fiction writers
Electronic dance music DJs
Omnivore Recordings artists
American male bloggers
20th-century American male musicians
Merge Records artists
Remote Control Records artists
Yep Roc Records artists
20th-century LGBT people
21st-century LGBT people
1960 births
American male songwriters
American expatriates in Germany
Anti- (record label) artists
Professional wrestling writers